The Shell Rock Bridge is a historic bridge located in Shell Rock, Iowa, United States. On May 11, 1915, the Butler County Board of Supervisors approved contracts for the Waterloo, Iowa bridge contractor Miller-Hey Construction Co. to build three bridges. This concrete filled spandrel arch bridge was completed in the fall of 1915 for $16,500. The bridge was designed by the Iowa State Highway Commission. It was listed on the National Register of Historic Places in 1998.

References

Bridges completed in 1915
Buildings and structures in Butler County, Iowa
Road bridges on the National Register of Historic Places in Iowa
Arch bridges in Iowa
National Register of Historic Places in Butler County, Iowa
Concrete bridges in the United States